The Commonwealth of Learning (COL) is an intergovernmental organisation of The Commonwealth headquartered in Metro Vancouver, British Columbia, Canada. Working collaboratively with governmental and nongovernmental organizations and other institutions in the Commonwealth, as well as with international development agencies, COL has the mandate to promote the use of open learning and distance education knowledge, resources and technologies.  The Board of Governors is chaired by Professor Narend Baijnath, former chief executive officer, Council on Higher Education, South Africa.

History
COL was founded at the 1987 Commonwealth Heads of Government Meeting (CHOGM) and inaugurated in 1988. Its title is a phrase used by philosopher John Locke to describe the body of knowledge developed over time by scientists and other thinkers, for the benefit of all people. At the time of its founding, COL focused on promoting economic development by providing education and teaching skills.

In 2012, Professor Asha Kanwar was appointed the president and chief executive officer of COL.

In 2015, COL created a six-year strategic plan to align itself with the Sustainable Development Goals (SDGs), specifically SDG4, which work to ensure inclusive and equitable quality education and lifelong learning for all by 2030. The Strategic Plan for 2021-2027 was developed against the backdrop of the COVID-19 pandemic. In this Plan, COL has reinvigorated its mandate to provide access to learning opportunities to those in need, making use of distance education and technologies. The 2021-2027 Strategic Plan also re-animates COL's various roles as enabler, capacity builder and catalyst for educational development.

COL hosts a triennial Pan-Commonwealth Forum (PCF) on Open Learning where its Excellence in Distance Education Awards (EDEA) are presented. The Ninth Pan-Commonwealth Forum (PCF9), co-hosted with The Open University, United Kingdom was held at BT Murrayfield Stadium, Edinburgh, Scotland on 9–12 September 2019. The Forum brought together 541 policy makers, practitioners and thought leaders from 61 countries. The resulting Edinburgh Statement summarised the collective actions necessary to significantly accelerate progress towards the aim and targets of SDG4.

Funding
Financial support for COL's core operations is provided by Commonwealth governments on a voluntary basis, with primary funding renewed every three years. COL also receives additional contributions from other development sources and provides fee-for-service distance education and open learning course delivery and training for various international agencies.

COL's major financial contributors include Australia, Canada, India, New Zealand, Nigeria, South Africa and the United Kingdom, all of which have representatives on COL's Board of Governors.

Initiatives 
Virtual University for Small States of the Commonwealth (VUSSC)  is a network of small countries that work collaboratively to expand access to and improve the quality of post-secondary education in their countries. Commonwealth Online Learning University (col.university) is an online learning university working collaboratively with the universities in Commonwealth.

References

External links 
Official Website
COL in The Commonwealth Website
infoDev, Commonwealth of Learning releases public report on NEPAD e-Schools
Nigeria: Country Partners Commonwealth on Distance Learning
SLADE, COL to empower farmers
Unesco guidelines way to go in distance education
Information Management Resource Kit (IMARK)  

Commonwealth Family
Distance education institutions based in Canada
Organizations based in Vancouver
Organizations established in 1988